Morangis is a commune in the Essonne department in the southern suburbs of Paris, France. It is located 18 kilometres from the center of Paris. A portion of Paris Orly Airport is in Morangis.

Population
Inhabitants of Morangis are known as Morangissois.

Transport
The nearest train station is Chilly-Mazarin station on Paris RER line C. The A6 autoroute pases through the commune and Paris - Orly Airport is nearby.

Education
Public primary schools include:
 Ecole maternelle Les Acacias (preschool)
 Ecole maternelle Les Hirondelles (preschool)
 Ecole élémentaire Edouard Herriot
 Ecole élémentaire Louis Moreau
 Ecole primaire Nelson Mandela

There is a public junior high school, Collège Michel Vignaud; a public senior high school/sixth-form college, Lycée Marguerite Yourcenar; and a private school, Ecole privée Saint-Joseph.

Twins cities
Plaidt, in Germany
Chard, Somerset, in England

See also
Communes of the Essonne department

References

External links

 Morangis website 
Mayors of Essonne Association 

Communes of Essonne